The World Series of Birding is perhaps the world's most famous birding competition. Participants try to identify the greatest number of bird species throughout the state of New Jersey, United States, over a 24-hour period on a Saturday in mid-May. The event is also run as a fundraiser for bird conservation, with participants soliciting pledges for each species they identify. The event is organized by the New Jersey Audubon Society.

Forms of competition 

There are a number of ways for birders to compete in the World Series of Birding. Teams can either search for birds throughout the state of New Jersey, limit themselves to a particular county, or tally species entirely within one single location. Different awards exist for the teams that find the highest number of species throughout New Jersey (the Urner-Stone Cup), a Limited Geographic Area (the LGA Award), or a single location of no more than a few square yards (the Big Day Big Stay Award). Separate awards also exist for the teams that find the highest species solely within Cape May County and Cape Island (the southern tip of Cape May, south of the Cape May Canal). Finally, different awards exist for the most successful youth teams (with three different age divisions) as well as the most successful all-senior team.

Regardless of what age or geographic classification teams fall under, teams must consist of at least three birders. All members of a team must normally see or hear a species for it to count (though not necessarily the same individual bird), although for each 20 species seen or heard by all team members, a team may count a species seen or heard by at least two, but not all, team members. The competition is run entirely on the honor system—but as there is no prize money to be won, cheating is not considered to be an issue.

History 

The idea for the World Series of Birding came from Pete Dunne, one of America's foremost authors on birding and natural history, and currently the director of the Cape May Bird Observatory. The first World Series of Birding was held on May 19, 1984, and the winning team included Dunne, David Sibley (author of the renowned The Sibley Guide to Birds), the late Pete Bacinski (former director of NJ Audubon's Owl Haven Nature Center and Sandy Hook Bird Observatory), Bill Boyle (author of A Guide to Bird Finding in New Jersey), and the legendary Roger Tory Peterson (inventor of the modern field guide) and was sponsored by Bird Watcher's Digest. Their total included 201 species, including a fork-tailed flycatcher—a tropical species rarely seen anywhere in the United States, let alone New Jersey.

Since the first competition, the World Series has been held annually on a date between May 9 and May 19, which coincides with the height of the spring bird migration through New Jersey. Winning tallies have ranged from a low of 182 species in 1985 to a high of 231 species in 2003 for the team sponsored by Nikon Sport Optics and the Delaware Valley Ornithological Club (DVOC). The event has steadily gained in popularity over the years; in 1984, 13 teams took part, compared with over 60 in 2006. Over the years, the World Series of Birding has raised more than $9,000,000 for bird conservation.

In 2007, filmmaker Jason Kessler released his documentary, "Opposable Chums: Guts & Glory at The World Series of Birding," which covered both the history and logistics of the event.

In 2022, Birdability’s “Team Nuthatch” became the first ever team in World Series’ history to be composed entirely of disabled birders.

Strategies 

Most teams that compete throughout the entire state start at midnight in the northern part of the state. During pre-daylight hours, teams often visit sites such as the Great Swamp National Wildlife Refuge that are home to certain kinds of owls, rails, and bitterns that are difficult to hear or see during the day. At daybreak, many teams find themselves in the far northern reaches of New Jersey attempting to find species such as purple finch and common raven that are difficult to find farther south. From 5-10 am, teams often pick up the majority of the species they will see all day. Afterwards, teams typically make their way into the central and southern parts of the state to places such as the Edwin B. Forsythe National Wildlife Refuge at Brigantine, Cape May, and Belleplain State Forest. After dusk, teams continue to search for the nocturnal species they may have missed at the start of the day, but must be at the "finish line" at Cape May Point State Park by midnight, or face stiff penalties.

Crucial to the success of any serious World Series effort is scouting for species in the days and weeks prior to the event. Most teams will have staked out desirable species (often nesting birds that can be reliably found on the day of competition) in advance to minimize the time they have to spend looking for any one species in particular. Additionally, teams should maximize the number of different habitats they visit (e.g., saltwater marshes, Canadian Zone woodlands, pine forests, beach, etc.), as different species frequent different habitats. Finally, teams should plan their route to maximize time spent birding and minimize time spent driving.

For more information on route planning and strategy, see Pete Dunne's "Blueprint for a Big Day," the World Series of Birding Discussion Forum, and the scouting notes of the Nikon/DVOC team that has won the World Series five out of the last eight years. All can be found under External Links.

Notes

See also
Big year
Breeding Bird Survey organised and monitored by the USGS
List of birdwatchers
The Big Year, 2011 film

External links
World Series of Birding Official Site
The website for the documentary "Opposable Chums: Guts & Glory at The World Series of Birding"
A description of one team's efforts in the World Series of Birding in 2005 and 2006

World Series of Birding Discussion Forum
Scouting Notes from the Nikon Sport Optics/Delaware Valley Ornithological Club team

Birdwatching